PLC or plc may refer to:

 Public limited company, a type of public company

Education
 Platoon Leaders Class, of the US Marine Corps Officer Candidates School
 Post Leaving Certificate, a qualification in Ireland
 Presbyterian Ladies' College (disambiguation), several schools in Australia
 Presidents Leadership Class at University of Colorado at Boulder, US
 Professional learning community, for collaborative learning

Medicine
 Perlecan, a protein in humans
 Peptide loading complex, an intracellular membrane protein matrix
 Peter Lougheed Centre, a hospital in Calgary, Alberta, Canada
 Phospholipase C, a class of membrane-associated enzymes
 Pityriasis lichenoides chronica, a skin condition
 Posterolateral corner, a region of the human knee

Politics
 Colombian Liberal Party
 Conservative Party (Spain)
 Constitutionalist Liberal Party, in Nicaragua
 Liberal Party of Canada
 Palestinian Legislative Council, of the Palestinian Authority
 Pennsylvania Leadership Conference, in the US
 Provisional Legislative Council, in Hong Kong 1997–1998

Technology
 Packet loss concealment, in VoIP communications
 Planar lightwave circuit splitter, a type of fiber-optic splitter
 Portevin–Le Chatelier effect, jerky flow under plastic deformation
 Power-line communication, or power-line carrier
 Product lifecycle, from inception to manufacture
 Programmable logic controller, an industrial digital computer

Other uses
 Pine Lake Camp, a Salvation Army camp in Alberta, Canada
 Polish–Lithuanian Commonwealth
 Portland Lesbian Choir, in Oregon, US
 Prism Leisure Corporation, a former British company
 UAE Pro League Committee, a football organising committee